Teleshovo is a rural locality (a village) in Nagornoye Rural Settlement, Petushinsky District, Vladimir Oblast, Russia. The population was 3 as of 2010.

Geography 
Teleshovo is located on the Voleshka River, 41 km northwest of Petushki (the district's administrative centre) by road. Stepanovo is the nearest rural locality.

References 

Rural localities in Petushinsky District